The 2005 President's Cup was the 55th season of the President's Cup, a knock-out competition for Maldives' top 4 football clubs.

Broadcasting rights
The broadcasting rights for all the matches of 2005 Maldives President's Cup were given to the Television Maldives.

Qualifier
Top 4 teams at the end of 2005 Dhivehi League will be qualified for the President's Cup.

Final qualifier

Semi-final Qualifier

Semi-final

Final

References
 President's Cup 2006 at RSSSF

President's Cup (Maldives)
Pres